High Cross may refer to:
 High cross, a free-standing Christian cross

Places 
England
High Cross, Cambridgeshire, a location
High Cross, Constantine, Cornwall
High Cross, Truro, Cornwall
High Cross, East Sussex, a location
High Cross, Hampshire
High Cross, East Hertfordshire, a location in Hertfordshire
High Cross, Hertsmere, a location in Hertfordshire
High Cross, Leicestershire
High Cross, Warwickshire, a location
High Cross, West Sussex, a location

Northern Ireland
High Cross, County Tyrone, a townland in County Tyrone, Northern Ireland

Wales
High Cross, Newport

Other
High Cross, a finisher move performed by professional wrestler Sheamus